Bigineyevo (Bigänäy) is a rural locality (a village) in Nizhnebaltachevsky Selsoviet, Tatyshlinsky District, Bashkortostan, Russia. The population was 205 as of 2010. There are 5 streets.

Geography 
Bigineyevo is located 16 km southeast of Verkhniye Tatyshly (the district's administrative centre) by road. Malaya Balzuga is the nearest rural locality.

References 

Rural localities in Tatyshlinsky District